Progress M-37 was a Russian unmanned Progress cargo spacecraft, which was launched in December 1997 to resupply the Mir space station.

Launch
Progress M-37 launched on 20 December 1997 from the Baikonur Cosmodrome in Kazakhstan. It used a Soyuz-U rocket.

Docking
Progress M-37 docked with the aft port of the Kvant-1 module of Mir on 22 December 1997 at 10:22:20 UTC, and was undocked on 30 January 1998 at 12:53 UTC, to make way for Soyuz TM-27. Following the redocking of Soyuz TM-27 to the forward port of the Mir Core Module, Progress M-37 was redocked to the Kvant-1 module on 23 February 1998 at 10:22:20 UTC, and finally undocked on 15 March 1998 at 19:16:01 UTC.

Decay
It remained in orbit until 15 March 1998, when it was deorbited. The deorbit burn occurred at 22:14:30 UTC, with the mission ending at 23:04:00 UTC.

See also

 1997 in spaceflight
 List of Progress missions
 List of uncrewed spaceflights to Mir

References

Progress (spacecraft) missions
1997 in Kazakhstan
Spacecraft launched in 1997
Spacecraft which reentered in 1998
Spacecraft launched by Soyuz-U rockets